Tommy Nield (born April 17, 1999) is a professional Canadian football wide receiver for the Toronto Argonauts of the Canadian Football League (CFL).

University career
While he had contemplated playing for his hometown Guelph Gryphons, Nield committed to the McMaster Marauders program where he played U Sports football from 2017 to 2019. In his third year with McMaster, he caught 48 passes for 688 yards and four touchdowns and was named a second-team OUA All-Star. He won the 2019 Yates Cup with the Marauders and was the leading receiver in the Mitchell Bowl loss to the Calgary Dinos where he had eight catches for 151 yards and one touchdown. He did not play in 2020 due to the cancellation of the 2020 U Sports football season and remained draft-eligible for the Canadian Football League in 2021.

Professional career
Nield was drafted in the fourth round, 30th overall, in the 2021 CFL Draft by the Toronto Argonauts and signed with the team on May 13, 2021. Following training camp, he agreed to a practice roster spot, but made his professional debut soon after in week 5 against the Hamilton Tiger-Cats on September 6, 2021, in the Labour Day Classic. He made his first professional start on October 30, 2021, against the BC Lions, but did not record a catch or a target in the game. He played in eight regular season games in 2021, but did not record any statistics.

After making the opening day roster for the 2022, Nield went back and forth to the practice roster over the next few games. However, he started at wide receiver on July 31, 2022, against the Ottawa Redblacks, where he recorded his first catch and finished the game with three receptions for 50 yards. He scored his first career touchdown on a 37-yard reception from McLeod Bethel-Thompson on October 8, 2022, against the BC Lions.

Personal life
Nield's father, Pat, played football for the Guelph Gryphons.

References

External links
Toronto Argonauts bio 

1999 births
Living people
Canadian football wide receivers
McMaster Marauders football players
Players of Canadian football from Ontario
Sportspeople from Guelph
Toronto Argonauts players